Events from the year 1695 in Sweden

Incumbents
 Monarch – Charles XI

Events
 
 Winter - Seven years of bad harvests result in the beginning of the Great Famine, and 1695 being known as the Black Year.
 The king dissolves the tapestry school Tapetskolan vid Karlberg.

Births

 - Hedvig Catharina Lillie, politically active salon hostess (died 1745) 
 June 24 - Martin van Meytens, painter  (died 1770) 
 17 August  - Gustaf Lundberg, rococo pastelist and portrait painter  (died 1786) 
 5 September - Carl Gustaf Tessin, Count and politician  (died 1770)

Deaths

 
 

 - Armegot Printz, colonial noblewoman  (born 1625)

References

 
Years of the 17th century in Sweden
Sweden